Toujiacuo is a railway station on the TRA Taichung line located in Tanzi District, Taichung, Taiwan. It opened on 28 October 2018.

See also
 List of railway and metro stations in Taiwan

References

2018 establishments in Taiwan
Railway stations in Taichung
Railway stations opened in 2018
Railway stations served by Taiwan Railways Administration